The Hanging Garden is a British/Canadian drama film, written and directed by Thom Fitzgerald and released in 1997. Fitzgerald's feature debut, the film was shot in Nova Scotia.

Plot

The film's central character is Sweet William, as both a thin adult and a fat teenager. Its plot hinges on a fateful incident from his teenage years, when his grandmother caught him attempting to have sex with his bisexual friend Fletcher, involuntarily outing him to his dysfunctional family as gay.

As a consequence of the ensuing rejection, particularly by his alcoholic father Whiskey Mac, Sweet William faced the difficult decision of whether to run away to live in a big city far away from his family, or to commit suicide by hanging himself from a tree in the family garden. The film's themes about the duality of life and death, and the way seemingly very different choices in life can lead to similar outcomes, are portrayed through magic realism in the film's depiction of a complex merged reality in which William appears to have successfully made both choices at the same time.

The film is told as a triptych. In the first segment, set in the present, the adult Sweet William has returned home to rural Nova Scotia for the first time since leaving ten years earlier, to attend the wedding of his sister Rosemary to Fletcher. However, upon his return, he makes two unexpected discoveries: he can still see his younger selves living there and walking around the house, and he also has a new young pre-teen sister named Violet, whom he has never met because she was born after he left. The second segment, set in the past, tells the story of Sweet William's teenage years leading up to the critical decision, including his bond with Rosemary and their mother Iris's struggles to protect her children from Whiskey Mac's abuse, as well as revealing the truth of Violet's origins, before ending with Sweet William's suicide. Returning to the present, the final segment features both the living adult and dead teenage Sweet William present in the same realityand the dead body is not just in his imagination, because the rest of his family can also see it still hanging from the tree.

According to writer and director Fitzgerald, "To every event in the film there are two interpretations. He left home and now he's back and his memory is haunting them. Or he did commit suicide when young and his homecoming is a fantasy?"

Cast 
 Chris Leavins as adult Sweet William
 Troy Veinotte as teenage Sweet William
 Kerry Fox as Rosemary
 Sarah Polley as teenage Rosemary
 Joel Keller as Fletcher
 Peter MacNeill as Whiskey Mac
 Seana McKenna as Iris
 Christine Dunsworth as Violet
 Joan Orenstein
 Heather Rankin
 Ashley MacIsaac as Basil, the wedding musician

Critical reaction
Roger Ebert favourably reviewed the film, writing that "It may be magic realism, but isn't it also the simple truth? Don't the ghosts of our former selves attend family events right along with our current manifestations? Don't parents still sometimes relate to us as if we were children, don't siblings still carry old resentments, aren't old friends still stuck on who we used to be? And don't we sometimes resurrect old personas and dust them off for a return engagement? Aren't all of those selves stored away inside somewhere?"

For Variety, Brendan Kelly wrote that "'The Hanging Garden' is often in danger of seeming overly pretentious, but Fitzgerald wisely undercuts the formal artiness with strong, emotional storytelling. In many ways, this is a simple yarn of a son dealing with the usual family demons and, on that level, is an affecting piece of filmmaking. Beyond that, the mix of film-school formalism and down-to-earth drama makes the pic a unique offering."

Awards
The film premiered at the 1997 Toronto International Film Festival, where it won the People's Choice Award and was cowinner with Atom Egoyan's The Sweet Hereafter of the juried award for Best Canadian Film. It was only the second film in the history of the festival, following Denys Arcand's The Decline of the American Empire in 1986, to win both awards.

It subsequently screened at the Atlantic Film Festival, where it won the Audience Award, the Best Canadian Film Award, the Best Atlantic Film Award, Best Writing and Best Direction nods for Fitzgerald, Best Actor for Veinotte and Best Actress for Orenstein. It also won the awards for Best Canadian Film at the Cinéfest Sudbury International Film Festival and the Vancouver International Film Festival.

The film received 11 Genie Award nominations at the 18th Genie Awards, for Best Picture, Best Director (Fitzgerald), Best Supporting Actor (MacNeill), Best Supporting Actress (3: McKenna, Fox, Orenstein),
Best Screenplay (Fitzgerald), Best Art Direction/Production Design (Taavo Soodor and Darlene Shiels), Best Costume Design (James A. Worthen), Best Overall Sound (Peter Harper, Phillipe Espantoso, George Hannan) and Best Editing (Susan Shanks). MacNeill and McKenna won the awards for Supporting Actor and Actress; Fitzgerald won for Best Screenplay, as well as winning the juried Claude Jutra Award for best first feature film.

The film was runner-up for the Rogers Best Canadian Film Award at the 1997 Toronto Film Critics Association Awards.

It premiered in the United States at the 1998 Sundance Film Festival, before going into wider theatrical release. It received a GLAAD Media Award nomination for Outstanding Film - Limited Release in 1999.

Soundtrack
A soundtrack album was released in 1997 on Virgin Music Canada.

 Ani DiFranco, "The Million You Never Made"
 Ashley MacIsaac, "Ashley's Reels"
 Mae Moore, "Deep Water"
 Spirit of the West, "Kiss and Tell"
 Jane Siberry, "When Spring Comes"
 Holly Cole, "Petals in a Stream"
 The Rankin Family, "Sir James Baird"
 Meryn Cadell and Mary Margaret O'Hara, "Wash Down"
 Mary Jane Lamond, "Ba Ba Mo Leanabh"
 Lori Yates, "The Future is Here"
 Deb Montgomery, "The Tale"
 Aether, "Half Light"
 Laurel MacDonald, "Oran na h'eala"
 John Roby, "Theme from The Hanging Garden"
 Leahy, "Colm Quigley"
 Wyrd Sisters, "If it Ain't Here"

References

External links
 

1997 films
English-language Canadian films
Canadian LGBT-related films
Canadian drama films
Best First Feature Genie and Canadian Screen Award-winning films
1997 drama films
Films directed by Thom Fitzgerald
Films shot in Nova Scotia
Films set in Nova Scotia
LGBT-related drama films
1997 LGBT-related films
Gay-related films
Magic realism films
1997 directorial debut films
1990s English-language films
1990s Canadian films